Kamarwet  is a town located in Mawlamyine District, Mon State of Myanmar

References

Township capitals of Myanmar
Populated places in Mon State
Old Cities of Mon people